Erythranthe primuloides is a Western United States perennial plant in the lopseed family (Phrymaceae), known by the common name primrose monkeyflower. It was formerly known as Mimulus primuloides.

Range and habitat
It is native to the western United States, including California. It grows in wet habitat in mountains and plateau areas, such as stream banks.

Description
Erythranthe primuloides is a perennial herb growing in low patches or mosslike mats and spreading via rhizome and stolon.

The stem is no more than about 12 centimeters long. The oppositely arranged leaves are variable in shape, variable in color from green to purple-green, shaggy-hairy to hairless, and up to 5 centimeters long.

The flower arises on an erect pedicel. The tubular base of the flower is encapsulated in a hairless calyx of sepals. The bright yellow flower is up to 2 centimeters long. It is divided into an upper lip with two lobes and a lower lip with three. Each of the three lower lobes are usually dotted with red.

References

External links
Jepson Manual Treatment
USDA Plants Profile
Photo gallery

primuloides
Flora of California
Flora of Nevada
Flora of Oregon
Flora of the Sierra Nevada (United States)
Flora without expected TNC conservation status